Mannan may refer to:

 Mannan (polysaccharide), a type of carbohydrate
 Mannan people, a social group of India
 Mannan language, a language of India
 Mannan (film), a 1992 Indian film
 Manannán, known in Manx as Mannan, a figure in Gaelic mythology

People with the name 
 Mannan Hira (1956–2020), Bangladeshi dramatist and filmmaker
 Khandaker Abdul Mannan, Bangladesh Freedom Party politician and the former Member of Parliament
 Gazi Alimuddin Mannan (1930–1990), Bangladeshi dancer and choreographer
 Hasina Mannan (born 1947), Bangladesh Awami League politician and the former Member of Parliament
 M. A. Mannan, Bangladesh Nationalist Party politician, first mayor of Gazipur City Corporation and former religious affairs minister
 M. Sam Mannan (1954–2018), American chemical engineer
 Masud Mannan (born 1961), Bangladeshi diplomat
 Muhammad Abdul Mannan (born 1946), Bangladeshi politician, diplomat and bureaucrat and the incumbent Minister of Planning of Bangladesh
 Rowshan Ara Mannan (born 1948), Bangladesh Jatiya Party politician
 Shamin Mannan (born 1995), Indian actress
 Sheikh Abdul Mannan (died 1971), Bangladeshi journalist
 Xulhaz Mannan (1976–2016), Bangladeshi hate crime victim
 Mannan Shaah (born 1987), Indian film music director, singer and composer

See also 
 
 Manan (disambiguation)
 Mannon (disambiguation)
 Mannen, a mountain in Norway